The following table lists ambassadors to the United States, sorted by the representative country or organization.

See also
Ambassadors of the United States

Notes

External links
Current and former Ambassadors to the United States: Chronological Listing by Country
Foreign Embassy Information & Publications - The U.S. Department of State's lists of foreign embassy officers and of foreign consular offices in the United States
Washington Diplomat Biographies - Foreign Ambassadors to the United States
Embassies in the United States
Embassyworld.com: Embassies of the World

 
United States